By-elections to the Auckland Council occur to fill vacant seats in the Council. The death, resignation, bankruptcy or expulsion of a sitting Councillor can cause a by-election to occur.

List of by-elections
The following is a list of by-elections held to fill vacancies on the Auckland Council:

Key

2011 by-election, Howick ward

2018 by-election, Maungakiekie-Tamaki ward

2018 by-election, Howick ward

References

Auckland Council
 Auckland Council
New Zealand, Auckland Council
New Zealand politics-related lists